The 3rd National Hockey League All-Star Game took place at Maple Leaf Gardens, home of the Toronto Maple Leafs, on October 10, 1949. For the third year in a row, the game saw the Maple Leafs play a team of NHL all-stars. The All-Stars won the game by a score of 3–1, the same as the previous game.

The game

Game summary

Referee: Bill Chadwick
Linesmen: Ed Mepham, Jim Primeau

Source: Podnieks

Rosters

Source: Podnieks

 Notes

Named to the first All-Star team in 1948–49.
Named to the second All-Star team in 1948–49.

References
 

03rd National Hockey League All-Star Game
All
1949
Ice hockey competitions in Toronto
National Hockey League All-Star Game
National Hockey League All-Star Game
National Hockey League All-Star Game, 1949